Lorita insulicola is a species of moth of the family Tortricidae. It is found on the British Virgin Islands and Guadeloupe.

The wingspan is about 7.5 mm. The ground colour of the forewings is cream with an indistinct yellowish admixture and ochreous cream suffusions. The hindwings are cream, tinged with brown on the periphery.

The larvae feed on the flowers of Mangifera indica.

Etymology
The species name refers to the insular distribution of the species and is derived from Latin insula (meaning island).

References

Moths described in 2007
Cochylini